Camptoceras is a genus of air-breathing freshwater snails with sinistral shells, aquatic pulmonate gastropod mollusks in the family Planorbidae.

Species
Species within the genus Campoceras include:
 Camptoceras austeni H. F. Blanford, 1871
 Camptoceras hirasei Walker, 1919
 Camptoceras terebra Benson, 1843

Synonyms
 Camptoceras jiraponi Hubendick, 1967: synonym of Culmenella jiraponi (Hubendick, 1967) (original combination)
 Camptoceras lineatum H. F. Blanford, 1871: synonym of Culmenella lineata (H. F. Blanford, 1871)
 Camptoceras obtusum Godwin-Austin, 1882 †: synonym of Camptoceratops priscus (Godwin-Austen, 1882) †
 Camptoceras priscum Godwin-Austen, 1882 †: synonym of Camptoceratops priscus (Godwin-Austen, 1882) † (original combination)
 Camptoceras rezvoji Lindholm, 1929 is a synonym for Culmenella rezvoji (Lindholm, 1929)
 Camptoceras subspinosum Annandale & Prashad, 1920: synonym of Culmenella subspinosa (Annandale & Prashad, 1920) (original combination)

References

External links
 Benson, W. H. (1843). Description of Camptoceras, a new genus of the Lymnaeadae, allied to Ancylus, and of Tricula, a new type of form allied to Melania. Calcutta Journal of Natural History, and Miscellany of the Arts and Sciences in India. 3(12): 465–468.
 Benson, W. H. (1855). Amended characters of the singular lymneadous genus Camptoceras, and description of a new Ancylus, inhabitants of North-western India. Annals and Magazine of Natural History. 15(85): 9-13

Planorbidae
Taxa named by William Henry Benson
Taxonomy articles created by Polbot